Crucero Carmita is a village in Luis Arcos Bergnes Popular Council (or Carmita), Camajuaní, Villa Clara, Cuba. It had a population of 704 people and has 261 houses. Nearby towns are Fusté, San José, Dolores, Corona, Aguijón, and Santana.

Education 
There is one school in Crucero Carmita, which is: 

 Julio Pino Primary

Economy
According at the DMPF of Camajuani, Crucero Carmita is a settlement linked to sources of employment or economic development.

References 

Populated places in Villa Clara Province